Benjamin Franklin Smith (May 8, 1865 – May 19, 1944) was a produce dealer and political figure in New Brunswick, Canada. He represented Carleton County in the Legislative Assembly of New Brunswick from 1903 to 1908, from 1915 to 1920 and from 1925 to 1930 as a Conservative member. Smith represented Victoria-Carleton in the House of Commons of Canada from 1930 to 1935 as a Conservative member and served in the Senate of Canada from 1935 to 1944.

He was born in Jacksonville, New Brunswick. Smith ran unsuccessfully for a federal seat in 1908, 1911 and 1921. He served in the province's Executive Council as Minister of Public Works from 1916 to 1917. Smith died in office at the age of 79.

References 

1865 births
1944 deaths
Progressive Conservative Party of New Brunswick MLAs
Conservative Party of Canada (1867–1942) MPs
Members of the House of Commons of Canada from New Brunswick
Canadian senators from New Brunswick